Marie Melchior Joseph Théodose de Lagrené (14 March 1800, in Amiens – 26 January 1862, in Paris), was a French legislator and diplomat.

Life 
Marie was born in Amiens, France in 1800 and hailed from an old family originally from Picardy. He joined the French diplomatic service at a young age and served in the foreign ministry under Mathieu de Montmorency, accompanying him to the Congress of Verona in 1822. The following year, Lagrené became a diplomat at the French embassy in Russia and subsequently fulfilled the same function at the French embassy in Constantinople. In 1828, he obtained the rank of ambassador while serving at the French embassy in Madrid. Lagrené remained in office after the establishment of the July Monarchy in 1830 and he went on to hold a number of prominent positions in the French foreign service. He was sent to Athens as minister in 1836.

In 1843, King Louis Philippe sent Lagrené to China with the title of Envoy extraordinary and Minister Plenipotentiary of France. He was sent with the aim of concluding a commercial treaty to secure the same privileges as the Sino-British Treaty of Nanking. On 24 October 1844, Lagrené and Qiying concluded the Treaty of Whampoa, which legalized the practice of Christianity in China and opened the way for missionary activities.

After the fall of the July Monarchy in 1848, Lagrené left the government service, and in 1849 he was elected as the representative of the Somme in the French legislative assembly, where he consistently supported conservative causes,  such as the restriction of the suffrage. Following Louis-Napoléon's coup d'état in 1851, Lagrené finally retired from public life.

References
Grosse-Aschhoff, Angelus Francis J. The Negotiations between Ch'i-Ying and Lagrené, 1844-1846. St. Bonaventure, N.Y.: Franciscan Institute, 1950.

Notes

External links
Biography from French national assembly

1800 births
1862 deaths
19th-century French diplomats
Peers of France
Ambassadors of France to Greece